Punk Goes X: Songs from the 2011 Winter X Games is the eleventh compilation album released from the Punk Goes... series created by Fearless Records. It was released on January 25, 2011, and features cover songs that were featured at the 2011 Winter X Games.

All the songs on the compilation have previously appeared on either Punk Goes Classic Rock or Punk Goes Pop Volume 03., with the exception of the first 2 tracks by The Word Alive and Sparks the Rescue, which are new tracks recorded for this particular compilation.

Track listing

Covers albums
Punk Goes series
2011 compilation albums
X Games